Walter Wright (February 19, 1901 – January 1982) was an American wrestler. He competed in the freestyle middleweight event at the 1924 Summer Olympics.

References

1901 births
1982 deaths
Olympic wrestlers of the United States
Wrestlers at the 1924 Summer Olympics
American male sport wrestlers
People from Webster, New York
Sportspeople from New York (state)